Odd is an unincorporated rural hamlet in Raleigh County, West Virginia, United States. It is located along Tommy Creek.  Only a post office is located there, with small residences spread along the nearby roads.

History 
The community's unusual name has attracted attention from writers. Townspeople were encouraged to think of an "odd" name for their town, hence the name.

Odd went viral in 2020 when Mark Laita's YouTube channel, Soft White Underbelly, posted a video of the Whittaker family, long-time residents of the small town who are inbred.

References

Unincorporated communities in Raleigh County, West Virginia
Unincorporated communities in West Virginia